Lucas López (born 30 January 1998) is an Argentine professional footballer who plays as a midfielder for Nueva Chicago.

Career
López progressed through the Nueva Chicago youth academy. He was moved to the first-team in 2019 under Walter Perazzo for an encounter against Central Córdoba on 3 April 2019 in the Copa Argentina, as he came off the substitutes bench on sixty-one minutes in place of Gonzalo Miceli during a home defeat. López made his Primera B Nacional debut as a second half substitute in a 3–2 loss to Quilmes, where he was fouled in the area in the 91st minute and teammate Alejandro Melo converted the resulting penalty.

Career statistics
.

References

External links

1998 births
Living people
Place of birth missing (living people)
Argentine footballers
Association football midfielders
Nueva Chicago footballers